Alypiodes radians, the radiant moth, is a moth of the family Noctuidae first described by Felder in 1874. They can be found in Mexico.

Description

References

External links 

 Alypiodes radians

Agaristinae